Charles McClary (March 3, 1833 – February 27, 1904) was a farmer and political figure in Quebec. He represented Compton in the Legislative Assembly of Quebec from 1894 to 1897 as a Conservative.

Biography
He was born in Stanstead Plain, Lower Canada, the son of Charles McClary and Betsy Cass, was educated in Compton and settled on a farm at Sainte-Edwidge-de-Clifton. He served on the town council for Clifton, also serving as mayor and warden for Compton County. In 1855, he married Jane Adeline McClary. He was elected to the Quebec assembly in an 1894 by-election held after John McIntosh was named county sheriff and did not run for reelection in 1897. He died in Montreal at the age of 70 and was buried in Compton.

References
 

Anglophone Quebec people
Conservative Party of Quebec MNAs
Mayors of places in Quebec
People from Estrie
1833 births
1904 deaths